Ian Wheeler (born 30 April 1949) is a New Zealand cricketer. He played in one List A match for Central Districts in 1974/75.

See also
 List of Central Districts representative cricketers

References

External links
 

1949 births
Living people
New Zealand cricketers
Central Districts cricketers
Cricketers from Hamilton, New Zealand